The Royal Cambodian Air Force is the branch of the Royal Cambodian Armed Forces which is charged with operating all military aircraft in Cambodia.

Organisation
The Royal Cambodian Air Force is commanded by General Soeung Samnang, who has four deputy commanders beneath him. The Air Force itself is under the jurisdiction of the Ministry of National Defence.

Air Force headquarters are located at Phnom Penh International Airport and is still sign posted Pochentong Air Base. The only operational aircraft at Pochentong Air Base are from the VIP squadron. Maintenance of aircraft and helicopters is also at Pochentong. The airworthy Z-9 and Mi-17 helicopters from the helicopter squadron are based at Phnom Penh International Airport and Siem Reap International Airport.

History
In September 1993, a new air arm, the Royal Cambodian Air Force, RCAF, was formed. Among its staff were included many officers which had served with the KAF and KPRAF. About half a dozen MiG-21s were returned to operational status, with about 10 Mi-8s and Mi-17s used for Gunship and Troop Transport duties forming the backbone of the RCAF.

During January and March 1994, government forces attacked two Khmer Rouge strongholds, Anlong Veng and Pailin, in eastern Cambodia. Some armed reconnaissance sorties were flown by the 701st Fighter Regiment. On one sortie, one MiG-21 received slight damage by small arms fire, its pilot making a forced landing at Battambang. However, due to the limited capability of the RCAF, its air assets were rarely used to full effect.

During 1995, a plethora of various transport and training aircraft were acquired from a number of countries, including China, France, Great Britain, Israel, Italy and the Ukraine. Among the aircraft acquired were 3 BN-2 Islander Light Transports, which were pressed into use as Light Attack Aircraft. 6 Tecnam P92 Trainers were delivered from Italy, while the Israel Aerospace Industries (IAI) supplied 6 L-39C Jet Trainers. IAI also offered to train and re-organize the RCAF. In the event, four MiG-21s were dispatched to Israel for refurbishment by IAI. The helicopter fleet of Mi-8s and Mi-17s were augmented by the delivery of 2 Mi-26T Heavy-Lift Helicopters from Ukraine. Incidentally, most of the helicopter pilots and maintenance staff were from Eastern Europe, being hired under contract to fly and maintain the Mi-8s and Mi-17s and Mi-26Ts.

Operations against the Khmer Rouge continued, with an offensive being launched during the 1996 dry season. With most of the MiG-21s grounded, the operational elements of the RCAF included 5 Mi-17 Gunships, 8 Mi-8s and Mi-17s Troop Transport, and 3 BN-2 Islanders, one of the latter being lost during the offensive.

By 1998, the last remnants of the Khmer Rouge had finally been defeated. The situation for the RCAF remained dire, though. 2 of the MiG-21s refurbished by IAI were returned to Cambodia in 1999, with the remaining 2 being embargoed due to the lack of payment. Lack of funds also prevented the refurbishments of a further 5 MiG-21s, as had been originally intended. By 2000, no less than 15 MiG-21s were in outside storage at Pochentong, slowly but steadily rotting away. Most of them appeared not to have been flown, or even moved for that matter, since at least 1992. The 2 Mi-26Ts were stored at Pochentong as well.

Since the end of the hostilities, RCAF operations have centred around training, liaison and VIP Transport. Sorties in support of humanitarian needs have been conducted as well. 5 of the L-39Cs are still in service, although at least 2 have been grounded at anytime due to lack of spares. As Cambodia remains one of the world's poorest and least developed countries, the future of the RCAF remains uncertain. For the foreseeable future, the remaining L-39Cs and 2 refurbished MiG-21s will constitute the sole combat aircraft. With no serious external threat, emphasis will be placed upon developing available training, liaison and Transport assets.

Current inventory

Sport

The force maintains a professional association football team as one of its branches, which formerly played in the C-League.

Air Force ranks and insignia

See also
 Cambodian Civil War
 Khmer National Armed Forces
 Khmer Air Force
 Royal Cambodian Army
 Royal Cambodian Armed Forces
 Royal Cambodian Navy
 Weapons of the Cambodian Civil War

References

 Hoyle, Craig. "World Air Forces Directory". Flight International, 11–17 December 2012, Vol. 182 No. 5370. pp. 40–64. ISSN 0015-3710.
 Hoyle, Craig. "World Air Forces Directory". Flight International. Vol. 194, No. 5665, 4–10 December 2018, pp. 32–60. 
 ''World Aircraft Information Files. Brightstar Publishing, London. File 337 Sheet 05

Air Force
Military units and formations established in 1953
Cambodia